Art Pepper with Warne Marsh is an album by alto saxophonist Art Pepper and tenor saxophonist Warne Marsh which was recorded in 1956 but not released on the Contemporary label in Japan until 1986. Several tracks were released on Pepper's 1972 compilation The Way It Was!, the title of the US CD reissue of this material.

Reception 

The AllMusic review noted "Marvelous work between Pepper and Warne Marsh".

Track listing 
 "I Can't Believe That You're in Love with Me" [original take] (Jimmy McHugh, Clarence Gaskill) – 5:23
 "I Can't Believe That You're In Love With Me" [alternate take] (McHugh, Gaskill) – 5:33
 "All the Things You Are" [original take] (Jerome Kern, Oscar Hammerstein II) – 6:32
 "All the Things You Are" [alternate take] (Kern, Hammerstein) – 6:26
 "What's New?" (Bob Haggart, Johnny Burke) – 4:04
 "Avalon" (Buddy DeSylva, Vincent Rose, Al Jolson) – 3:50
 "Tickle Toe" (Lester Young) – 4:50
 "Warnin'" [take 1] (Art Pepper) – 6:06
 "Warnin'" [take 2] (Pepper) – 5:50
 "Stompin' at the Savoy" (Edgar Sampson, Benny Goodman, Chick Webb, Andy Razaf) – 5:50

Personnel 
Art Pepper – alto saxophone
Warne Marsh – tenor saxophone (tracks 1–4 & 6–9)
Ronnie Ball – piano
Ben Tucker – bass
Gary Frommer – drums

References 

1986 albums
Art Pepper albums
Warne Marsh albums
Contemporary Records albums